Parliamentary elections were held in Kosovo on 8 June 2014, after incumbent Prime Minister Hashim Thaçi announced his intention to hold elections.

On 7 May, the Assembly was dissolved and President Atifete Jahjaga confirmed the Election date as 8 June 2014.

Results

Aftermath
Foreign media viewed the election results as "inconclusive". According to the Constitution, "If no one challenges the election results within 24 hours, parliament will have 30 days to convene. The prime minister-designate will then have 15 days to form a government that has the backing of a majority of deputies." Incumbent Prime Minister Hashim Thaci and the PDK were expected to be the first to form government, having won a plurality of the seats in the election. However, an opposition coalition of the LDK, AAK, and NISMA sought to form a governing coalition, arguing that together they could form a majority of the seats in parliament.

When parliament resumed in July, the opposition coalition attempted to elect LDK leader Isa Mustafa as Speaker of Parliament, but only after a member of Thaci's party had walked out of the vote.

This constitutional crisis dragged on for several months, until the PDK formed a governing coalition with the LDK. Under the agreement, LDK leader Isa Mustafa would become Prime Minister, while Thaci would be Deputy Prime Minister and Minister of Foreign Affairs.

Parliamentary struggles continued for Kosovo after the government was formed. Vetëvendosje, an opposition party staunchly opposed to the 2013 Brussels Agreement between Kosovo and Serbia, vowed that "no session will be held until the government renounces a deal with Serbia that gives greater rights to Serbs living in northern Kosovo." Opposition members of parliament set off nine smoke bombs in the parliamentary chambers over a period of six months.

References

Kosovo
Elections in Kosovo
2014 in Kosovo
History of the Republic of Kosovo
June 2014 events in Europe